The InterTown Series is a summer rugby league competition organised by the British Amateur Rugby League Association (BARLA). It is contested by teams representing districts made up of players from clubs in that area.

Winter leagues fully or partially affiliated to BARLA include: the National Conference League, North West Counties League, CMS Yorkshire League, Pennine League, Cumberland League, Barrow & District League and the Hull & District League. 

The InterTown Series takes place between representative teams during the summer off-season with games in June and July to avoid affecting clubs. Players are eligible for selection by the district which their last club is a member of. At present the InterTown Series is restricted to districts in Yorkshire.

History

The competition started in 2008 with Castleford & Featherstone, Leeds and Wakefield districts producing representative teams to take part in a summer competition. The first title was won by Wakefield.

Interest was expressed in the 2009 Series by a number of other Yorkshire service areas and York, Heavy Woollen district and Halifax joined the competition which was divided into two pools.

2009 structure

The competition is split into two groups of three with each team playing opposition both home and away. The eventual winners of each group will be play off in the grand final and plans are for it to be held at Headingley Stadium.

Past winners

 2008 Wakefield

References

External links
 BARLA Official Website

BARLA competitions